The Czech political party TOP 09 was held a leadership election on 20 November 2021. The incumbent leader Markéta Pekarová Adamová was running for reelection.

Background
Pekarová Adamová was elected party leader in 2019. Under her leadership TOP 09 participated 2021 Czech legislative election as part of Spolu alliance and received 14 seats in the Chamber of Deputies. Pekarová herself was then nominated for a position of the Speaker of the Chamber of Deputies. On 5 November 2021 Adamová announced her candidacy for party leader. She noted that during her announcement that party doubled number of its MPs and is joining coalition government. Adamová received nomination from 11 regional organisations.

Candidates
Markéta Pekarová Adamová, the incumbent leader.

Voting
Voting took place on 20 November 2021. She was the only candidate and received 163 of 176 votes and thus was reelected.

References

TOP 09 leadership elections
2021 elections in the Czech Republic
TOP 09 leadership election